José Augusto Brandão (April 21, 1911 – July 20, 1989) was an association football midfielder. He was born in Taubate, São Paulo State.

In his career (1927–1946) he played for Barra Funda, Juventude, Portuguesa and Corinthians. He played two matches for the national team in the 1938 World Cup.

Notes

References

Seleçao Brasileira 1914–2006. Antonio Carlos Napoleao

1911 births
1989 deaths
People from Taubaté
Brazilian footballers
Brazil international footballers
Association football midfielders
Sport Club Corinthians Paulista players
Associação Portuguesa de Desportos players
Esporte Clube Juventude players
1938 FIFA World Cup players
Footballers from São Paulo (state)